Sumner Township, Illinois may refer to one of the following townships:

 Sumner Township, Kankakee County, Illinois
 Sumner Township, Warren County, Illinois

See also

Sumner Township (disambiguation)

Illinois township disambiguation pages